Sueoka is a Japanese surname. Notable people with the surname include:

 Ryuji Sueoka (末岡 龍二, born 1979), Japanese footballer
 Kunitaka Sueoka (末岡 圀孝, 1917–1998), Japanese footballer

Japanese-language surnames